The 34th Junior World Luge Championships took place under the auspices of the International Luge Federation at Innsbruck, Austria from 1 to 2 February 2019.

Schedule
Four events will be held.

Medalists

Medal table

References

Junior World Luge Championships
Junior World Luge Championships
Junior World Luge Championships
Luge
Luge in Austria
Sport in Innsbruck
International sports competitions hosted by Austria
Junior World Luge Championships